Back Street is a romance novel written by Fannie Hurst in 1931, with underlying themes of death and adultery. It has been filmed five times since its publication:

 In 1932 by director John M. Stahl, starring John Boles and Irene Dunne.
 In 1941 by director Robert Stevenson, starring Charles Boyer and Margaret Sullavan
In 1948 by director Esther Eng, who changed the story's setting to the Chinese-American community in San Francisco.
 In 1961 by director David Miller, starring Susan Hayward and John Gavin.
In 1965 by director Mahmoud Zulfikar, starring Salah Zulfikar and Shadia.

The 1932, 1941, and 1961 versions were released by Universal Pictures, and the third was in Technicolor.

References 

1931 American novels
American novels adapted into films
American romance novels
Adultery in novels